Ernst Steindorff (15 June 1839 – 9 April 1895) was a German historian who was a native of Flensburg.

He studied history at the Universities of Kiel, Göttingen and Berlin. From 1873 he was an associate professor of history at Göttingen, where in 1883 he became a full professor.

Steindorff is remembered as author of the two-volume Jahrbücher des Deutschen Reichs unter Heinrich III (Annals of the German Empire under Henry III) (1874–81). He also published the sixth edition of the Dahlmann-Waitz Quellenkunde der Deutschen Geschichte. Furthermore, he was the author of numerous biographies in the Allgemeine Deutsche Biographie.

References 
 Wikisource Steindorff, Ernst translated biography @ Allgemeine Deutsche Biographie

People from Flensburg
Academic staff of the University of Göttingen
1839 births
1895 deaths
19th-century German historians
19th-century German male writers
German male non-fiction writers